Patrick Mitchell may refer to:
 Patrick Mitchell (priest) English Anglican priest
 Patrick Mitchell (football), British Virgin Islands football manager
 Paddy Mitchell, bank robber